The 2016 Beijing Guoan F.C. season was their 13th consecutive season in the Chinese Super League, established in 2004, and 26th consecutive season in the top flight of Chinese football. They competed at the Chinese Super League and Chinese FA Cup.

Players

First team
As of July 16, 2016

Reserve team
As of July 16, 2016

Transfers

Winter

In:

 

Out:

Summer

In:

 

Out:

Club

Coaching staff

|}

Friendlies

Pre-season

Mid–season

Competitions

Chinese Super League

Table

Matches

Chinese FA Cup

References

Beijing Guoan F.C. seasons
Chinese football clubs 2016 season